Devil Dog is a nickname for a United States Marine coined during World War I.

History
Multiple publications of the United States Marine Corps claim that the nickname "Teufel Hunden"—"Devil Dogs" in English—was bestowed upon the Marines by German soldiers at the Battle of Belleau Wood in June 1918. However, on April 14, 1918, six weeks before the battle began, hundreds of U.S. newspapers ran a fanciful wire service report that stated "the Teutons have handed the sea soldiers [a nickname] ... They call the American scrappers 'teufel hunden,' which in English means 'devil dogs'." Journalist H. L. Mencken wrote in 1921 that the term was the invention of an American war correspondent. Robert V. Aquilina of the United States Marine Corps History Division has stated that while there is no evidence of German use of the term, it has nevertheless become entrenched in Marine Corps lore.

"Devil Dog" was also the nickname of the amphibious assault ship , as well as the mascot of the Quantico Marines football team.

See also
 Chesty XV
 Dogface
 Jarhead
 Leatherneck

Explanatory notes

References

United States Marine Corps lore and symbols